Vanchak Voradilok (1934 – October 2017) was a Thai sprinter. He competed in the men's 100 metres at the 1956 Summer Olympics. He was later part of the organising committee for the 1995 Southeast Asian Games, held in Thailand.

References

External links
 

1934 births
2017 deaths
Athletes (track and field) at the 1956 Summer Olympics
Vanchak Voradilok
Vanchak Voradilok
Place of birth missing